was a Japanese artist whose work is featured at the Yokohama Museum of Art.

He was regarded of one of the fathers of New Nihonga, and is known for he quote to his students "I break the Old Nihonga, You should follow me and build New Nihonga."

See also
 Gyoshū Hayami

References

External links
 Yokohama Museum of Art

1880 births
1916 deaths
20th-century Japanese painters